New England frog may refer to:

 New England swamp frog (Litoria castanea), a frog endemic to southeastern Australia
 New England tree frog (Litoria subglandulosa), a frog endemic to Australia